The 10th Canadian Folk Music Awards was presented at The Bronson Centre in Ottawa, Ontario on November 29, 2014 and was hosted by the CBC's Shelagh Rogers and musician Benoit Bourque.

Nominees and recipients
Recipients are listed first and highlighted in boldface.

Other special awards
Harvey Glatt received the Unsung Hero award for his decades of support to the Canadian folk music scene. Paul Symes was given the award for Innovator of the Year, in recognition of the "tenacity, vision and innovation" required to establish a venue outside Ottawa.

References

External links
Canadian Folk Music Awards

10
Canadian Folk Music Awards
Canadian Folk Music Awards
Canadian Folk Music Awards
Canadian Folk Music Awards